Nicolae Voinov (1834–May 29, 1899) was a Romanian politician.

Born in Focșani, Voinov was educated in his native country, following which he entered the magistracy. He first served as a prosecutor and then, from 1862 to 1864, presided over the Putna County tribunal. He wrote for Zimbru and Steaua Dunărei newspapers. Voinov was eventually attracted by politics, serving a number of terms as deputy and senator. From November 1883 to January 1885, he was Justice Minister in the National Liberal government of Ion C. Brătianu. He later joined the United Opposition and then the Constitutional Party of Petre P. Carp.

His adopted son was the biologist Dimitrie Voinov.

Notes

1834 births
1899 deaths
People from Focșani
National Liberal Party (Romania) politicians
Members of the Senate of Romania
Members of the Chamber of Deputies (Romania)
Romanian Ministers of Justice
19th-century Romanian judges
Romanian prosecutors
Romanian journalists